The 1931 Hessian state election was held on 15 November 1931 to elect the 70 members of the Landtag of Hesse.

Results

References 

Hesse
Elections in Hesse